Anne Nagel (born Anna Marie Dolan; September 29, 1915 – July 6, 1966) was an American actress. She played in adventures, mysteries, and comedies for 25 years. She also appeared in television series in the 1950s. One book described her as "one of Hollywood's true hard-luck gals".

Early life
Born in Malden, Massachusetts, Nagel was enrolled by her parents in Notre Dame Academy, with the expectation that she would become a nun. Membership in the Shubert Theatre company turned her away from religious life. In the meantime, Nagel's mother had divorced and remarried. When Nagel's new stepfather, Curtis Nagel, a Technicolor expert, was hired by Tiffany Pictures in Hollywood, he moved the family to California, where he employed his stepdaughter in several experimental Technicolor shorts he had been asked to direct.

Career
Placed under contract by Warner Brothers in 1932, Nagel secured a bit part as a ballet girl in Hypnotized, her "first documented feature credit". She was one of 14 young women "launched on the trail of film stardom" August 6, 1935, when they each received a six-month contract with 20th Century Fox after spending 18 months in the company's training school. The contracts included a studio option for renewal for as long as seven years. Nagel spent the next few years making uncredited appearances as a dancer or chorus girl. In 1936, she appeared in Here Comes Carter with Ross Alexander. A reviewer wrote "she was just one of those girls who has learned to croon for the microphone, and let the rest of the world go hang". Her early roles were in Footloose Heiress, Three Legionnaires, Guns of the Pecos, Torchy Blane, the Adventurous Blonde (all from 1937). She was in Romance Road (1938), Mystery House (1938), Unexpected Father (1939), and Legion of Lost Flyers (1939).

In 1940, she appeared with W.C. Fields and Mae West in My Little Chickadee. Other films from 1940 in which she had parts are Black Friday, Hot Steel, and Diamond Frontiers. She was often a heroine in horror films. In the late 1940s, she made The Spirit of West Point (1947). The film starred Doc Blanchard and Glenn Davis. Nagel later worked on television in episodes of The Range Rider (1951) and Circus Boy (1957).

On radio, Nagle was a vocalist on the game show Scramby Amby. She had the role of Miss Case in The Green Hornet radio series,  a role she reprised for both of the filmed serials The Green Hornet and The Green Hornet Strikes Again!.

Personal life and death
On September 17, 1936, Nagel married actor Ross Alexander; who committed suicide in 1937. Nagel then married Air Force Lt. Col. James H. Keenan on December 4, 1941. The marriage ended in divorce on May 22, 1951.

In December 1947, Nagel filed a lawsuit in Superior Court against Hollywood physician and surgeon Franklyn Thorpe (former husband of actress Mary Astor). In the suit, Nagel demanded $350,000 in damages and alleged that, while performing an appendectomy on her in 1936, Thorpe had removed other organs without her knowledge or consent, rendering her infertile.   Nagel claimed she was unaware of her infertility until January 1947, but Thorpe countered that she was "well aware of the nature of the surgery". 

Nagel died at Sunray North Convalescent Hospital in Hollywood, California in 1966, aged 50, following surgery for liver cancer. She is buried, with no marker, in Holy Cross Cemetery in Culver City, California.

Selected filmography

Notes

References

 Appleton, Wisconsin Post Crescent, "Anne Nagel's Death Revives Old Mystery", Monday, August 29, 1966, Page A11.
 Los Angeles Times, "Final Rites Set for Actress Anne Nagel", Page B10.
 The New York Times, "Anne Nagel Dies; Movie Actress, 50", July 8, 1966, Page 26.
 Reno, Nevada State Journal, "Movie Actor Kills Self", January 3, 1937, Page 1.
 Photos Ann Nagel, "https://www.picsofcelebrities.com/celebrity/anne-nagel/pictures/images-of-anne-nagel.html"

External links

 
 
 July 21, 1966 Tuscaloosa News Article on Anne Nagel's Death

1915 births
1966 deaths
American film actresses
American television actresses
Burials at Holy Cross Cemetery, Culver City
Deaths from cancer in California
Deaths from liver cancer
Actresses from Boston
Actresses from Los Angeles
20th-century American actresses